Negrini is an Italian surname. Notable people with the surname include:

Alessandra Negrini (born 1970), Brazilian actress
Antonio Negrini (1903–1994), Italian cyclist
Carlo Negrini (1826–1865), Italian opera singer
Chiara Negrini (born 1979), Italian volleyball player
Clare Negrini
Gualtiero Negrini (born 1961), American opera singer
Luciano Negrini (born 1920), Italian rower
Matteo Negrini (born 1982), Italian footballer
Vincenzo Negrini (1804–1840), Italian opera singer

See also
 Nigrini

Italian-language surnames